Louis-Nicolas Séjan (10 June 1786 – March or April 1849) was a French organist and composer.

Biography
The son of Nicolas Séjan, he succeeded him on the organ of the Church of Saint-Sulpice in Paris and that of the Hôtel des Invalides. When the Chapelle Royale was closed in 1830, he lost his position as organist. In 1848, his salary at Saint-Sulpice was so reduced that he was forced to resign. He left Paris in March 1848 and died shortly after at the age of 63.

He has left works for organ, chamber music and an opera, Fénella.

References

External links
 
 Prelude and fugue in C minor by Louis-Nicolas Séjan on YouTube
 Duo Concertant: harpe-piano on Musicalics

1786 births
1849 deaths
19th-century classical composers
Composers for pipe organ
French classical organists
French male organists
French Romantic composers
Musicians from Paris
19th-century French male musicians
Male classical organists
19th-century organists